Dr. Edward Thomas Abrams (November 20, 1860 – May 20, 1918) was an American physician.

Early life
Abrams' parents, Michael Abrams and Lydia Chegwyn Abrams, came from Cornwall, England. Abrams was born in a miner's cabin in Eagle River, Michigan, November 20, 1860. His early life was a period of hard struggle to gain an education. Between the ages of thirteen and eighteen, he was apprenticed to a blacksmith; he then began to teach at a country school to earn the money which would enable him to go to college. After obtaining in 1883 a Bachelor of Science degree at Valparaiso, he attended Dartmouth Medical School, from which he was graduated in 1889. Later he did postgraduate work at Long Island College Hospital, and in 1902 Olivet conferred on him the honorary degree of Master of Arts. The doctor began his practice in Centennial, Michigan, and later removed to Dollar Bay, where he spent the remainder of his life.

In 1890 he was married to Ida L. Howe, of Howell, Mich. One child, a daughter, was born to them, but died in early infancy. He was survived by his wife, several sisters and two brothers, one of whom, James Abrams, was a physician at Calumet, Mich.

Career
In 1907 he was elected to the Michigan House of Representatives. His legislative experience and knowledge of parliamentary procedure made him the backbone of all medical legislation in the state. Appreciation of the fairness of his nature was shown, when in 1913, during the copper miners' strike, the State appointed him as intermediary between agitators and employers. He was a politician of high type, straightforward and relentless in his pursuit of right. Nothing could stop him when on the trail of error, if he believed his action would be beneficial. It was said of him that he had stopped More detrimental and furthered more useful measures than any other medical man in Michigan. These same characteristics were not only evidenced in state affairs, but had an influence national in scope. In much demand as a public speaker, he rarely spoke at length, but always with a wonderfully earnest manner and a masterful delivery. His knowledge of history, combined with his enthusiasm, made him a most interesting speaker. Without doubt he was the best authority in the state on Cornish history, beliefs and customs. In short, he was ever loyal to the spirit of his ancestry. Dr. Abrams was the owner of a fine medical library with full files of about twenty periodicals.

He was intensely patriotic and at the time of his death was president of the local chapter of the Red Cross, member of the state committee, Council of National Defense, and, as acting president of the State Board of Health, was much interested in Camp Custer, and made frequent visits there.

Physically, Dr. Abrams was rather small, but wiry and active. At one time he was fond of wrestling, and very proficient in the art. His fingers were remarkably slender and quick in the most delicate operations.

Besides being a member of the American Association of Obstetricians and Gynecologists, Dr. Abrams belonged to the American Medical Association, was a member of the state and local medical organizations, charter member of the A. K. K., one of the oldest medical fraternities; also member of the American Society of Social and Political Economics, and the American Geographical Society.

He was surgeon to various railroad and mining companies in the Upper Peninsula; consulting surgeon and lecturer on gynecology and obstetrics at the Lake Superior General Hospital, Lake Linden; surgeon-in-chief to St. Joseph's Hospital at Hancock.

His last appearance in public was in addressing a gathering for the Red Cross the evening before his death. His talk was masterly and full of feeling. It was remarked that he spoke from first to last as one inspired, as one apart and looking on. His death occurred suddenly, shortly before midnight, May 20, 1918, after an evening spent in study in his library.

References

External links 
 Edward Thomas Abrams at findagrave.com

1860 births
1918 deaths
People from Houghton County, Michigan
People from Keweenaw County, Michigan
Members of the Michigan House of Representatives
Valparaiso University alumni
Geisel School of Medicine alumni
Physicians from Michigan